DYHP (612 AM) RMN Cebu is a radio station owned and operated by the Radio Mindanao Network. Its studios and offices are located at the RMN Broadcast Center, G/F Capitol Central Hotel and Suites, N. Escario St., cor. F. Ramos Ext., Capitol Site, Cebu City and at RMN Drama Production Center, Room 302, 3/F Jose R. Martinez Bldg., Osmeña Blvd., Cebu City; while its transmitter facilities are located along DYHP-IFM Transmitter Site, Sitio Seaside Asinan, Brgy. Basak San Nicolas, Cebu City. DYHP is the pioneer AM radio station in Cebu.

Broadcasting history
DYHP commenced its operations on September 13, 1963, with the opening of DYHP - "The Sound of the City" in Cebu under the auspices of the Philiipine Herald newspaper and Inter-Island Broadcasting Corporation; three years after RMN started expanding to the Visayas, which established the radio station in Iloilo, DYRI in 1960. The station was then broadcasting on the frequency of 600 kHz and became the fourth commercial radio station in the city. DYHP was the first AM radio station in Cebu with a mix of English and Cebuano languages in its broadcasts. During the existence, the station's studio was located along Legazpi cor. Manalili Street, Cebu City, while the transmitter located at Alumnos, Barangay Mambaling.

In the same year, a Cebuano drama production center based in DYHP-Cebu was established and subsequently followed by an Ilonggo drama production center based in DYHB-Bacolod in 1964. Among the former DYHP-Cebu talents from the past were the late Susan Perez (Now Aliño), Elma Vestil, Nelson Tantano, Teresa Diez, Esper Palicte, Janice Gimena, Debbie Santa Cruz, Carolyn Marquez, Wilma Silva and more.

DYHP began airing its radio drama Kun Ako Ang Pasultihon ("If I Were To Be Told"), a comedy drama written and directed by the late famous radio personality and Cebu Provincial Board Member Julian "Teban" Daan. The drama talks about ordinary problems of ordinary people to which Daan and Priscilla Raganas, RMN's premiere leading lady gets to pitch in their advices as ordinary people. On the other hand, Kini Ang Akong Suliran ("This Is My Problem") is a program which dramatizes legal and medical problems send by listeners, which will be advised by then Dra. Lourdes Libres Rosaroso, while Handumanan Sa Usa Ka Awit ("Memory Of A Song") narrates and give stories of love sent by RMN's avid listeners to the drama production center's mailing currently hosted by Ms. Priscilla Raganas (originally hosted by Ms. Perez Aliño until her departure to DYSS).

On September 21, 1972, when then-President Ferdinand Marcos declared Martial Law from the issuance of Proclamation 1081, DYHP, along with other RMN AM radio stations, were seized its operations. Several years later, the station returned to the airwaves as DYHP, Ang Radyo Natin, the localized version of Manila's DZXL that used to be known as Ang Radyo Natin until December 31, 1987. The successful of its radio station was further led to the opening of sister FM station DYXL (then known as YXL 93.9), which established in 1976 and started their regular operations on September 9, 1978. At that time, the station operated daily from 4:00 a.m. to 12:00 m.n. the following day.

On November 23, 1978, following the switch from the NARBA-mandated 10 kHz to the adoption of the 9 kHz spacing implemented by the Geneva Frequency Plan of 1975 on AM radio stations in the Philippines and across the Asia-Pacific region, DYHP assigned its current frequency to 612 kHz. On New Year's Day of January 1, 1988, the station shifted its programming to dynamic news and public affairs station under the name Radyo Agong, which became one of the few provincial stations of Radio Mindanao Network to carry such branding, until finally adapted the RMN branding in 1999.

On September 13 of the same year, DYHP celebrates its 25th anniversary with the theme, "25-10 on September 13" to be held at the Cebu Coliseum included promos that will giving more prizes to the listeners for each two radio stations, as well as furnitures, appliances and radio sets to be given away. After a series of radio surveys in the city, DYHP became one of the most popular AM radio station in the entire province of Cebu.

During the early 1990s, DYHP also aired its programs via satellite thru various stations in Visayas and Northern Mindanao. These are DYHD Tagbilaran (now defunct; but affiliation went to DYTR), DYRR Ormoc, DYWC Dumaguete, DYRS San Carlos, DXDR Dipolog and DXRS Surigao (now inactive). In 1993, the station moved from the former studio in Legazpi cor. Manalili Street to its new studio location at Gold Palace Building, Osmeña Boulevard.

On March 2, 2009, as part of its nationwide expansion, RMN stations launched its new logo and became part of the Radyo Mo Nationwide network. During its relaunch, RMN was released a new corporate station ID and a jingle entitled, "Tatak RMN", sung by Wency Cornejo. At the same time, the station's transmitter facilities moved from Alumnos, Barangay Mambaling to its new transmitter site in White Road, Barangay Inayawan for better signal reception.

On May 26, 2012, DYHP and its sister station 93.9 iFM transferred from Gold Palace Building in Osmeña Boulevard to its current home at the G/F Capitol Central Hotel & Suites (formerly The Professional Group Center), N. Escario Street cor. F. Ramos Extension on Capitol Site, and its Production Center transferred to the 3/F Jose R. Martinez Building, Jones Avenue on Osmeña Boulevard to adjust to modern broadcast settings.

In June 2014, CCTN-47's afternoon local newscast Sayri 47 began airing its simulcast over this station to provides news and information, with some of DYHP correspondents are joined to the latter. In 2015, DYHP started airing a drama entitled, "Sabungera". Radio drama was about a person who was adopted by a certain man. As the person grew up, they became fond and grew successful with cockfighting. Not long after, the person knew that one of the competitors was his biological father.

In March 2019, DYHP commenced its round-the-clock broadcasting service, making it the only AM station in the market following Bantay Radyo ceased their operations in 2015. However, the station still signed-off every Sunday from 10:00 p.m. to 4:00 a.m. the next day for its regular transmitter maintenance and annual Paschal Triduum of Holy Week for its annual Holy Week maintenance. On June 28 of the same year, DYHP broadcast a story of a person, along with their family, who survived a storm (possibly Typhoon Haiyan), only to have their mother die from sickness not long after.

On February 11, 2021, the station went off the air for the second time due to the technical upgrades and repair of transmitter facilities, but can still be heard on online streaming. It only resumed operations on February 13, 2021, after 2 days of technical upgrade and started to operate in full power with better signal reception and audio quality. As of today, the station returns of regularly programming in provides news, public service, drama and music.

On September 13, 2022, as part of their 59th anniversary, DYHP had its blessings and inauguration of the station's 10,000-watt transmitter equipments, towers and buildings located at the newly DYHP-IFM Transmitter Site in Sitio Seaside Asinan, Brgy. Basak San Nicolas; and at the same time, the station became the first AM radio station to broadcast in the highly situated clearest signal in the whole Central and Eastern Visayas, and Mindanao region. Its old transmitter, which used to be transferred in 2009, is now occupied by National Grid Corporation of the Philippines.

References

Radio stations established in 1963
News and talk radio stations in the Philippines
Radio stations in Metro Cebu